Lionel Messi (born 1987) is an Argentine footballer.

Messi may also refer to:

People
 Messi Bouli (born 1992), Cameroonian footballer
 Nickname of Ismail Easa, Maldivian footballer 
 Georges Messi (born 1980), Cameroonian footballer
 Joaquín Messi (born 2002), Argentine footballer
 Stéphane Messi (born 1972), French table tennis player

Others
 Jaunde-Texte von Karl Atangana und Paul Messi, a 1919 book by Charles Atangana and Paul Messi
 Messi (2014 film), a documentary about Lionel Messi
 Messi (2017 film), a Bengali football drama
 Messi (cougar), a domesticated cougar living with a Russian couple
 Messi (song), a 2016 song by English rapper Dappy
 Messi and Maud, also known as La Holandesa, 2017 Dutch film

See also
 Mesi (disambiguation)
 Messe (disambiguation)
 Messy (disambiguation)